Legh Hewitson Davis is a former Australian politician. He was a Liberal member of the South Australian Legislative Council from 1979 to 2002, when he retired from politics.

References

Living people
Liberal Party of Australia members of the Parliament of South Australia
Members of the South Australian Legislative Council
Place of birth missing (living people)
21st-century Australian politicians
Year of birth missing (living people)